FGL Productions is an independent music record, entertainment and video production company, headquartered in France (Paris), with offices in the United Kingdom (London), Russia (Moscow), and Thailand (Nonthaburi).

FGL Productions’ history 
Founded in Paris in 1981 as a music record company focusing on re-issuing of major works from the popular music catalogue, the company is managed, since 1990, by his current chief executive officer Thierry Wolf.

FGL Productions’ services 

FGL Productions is organized around four departments:

 Music publishing department, with a significant number of French and international song writers and music composers,
 Video production house, producing musical videos, TV documentaries and movies (Executive production),
 Synchronisation department, offering movie, TV series, and advertising movie producers, or video game editors, a rich repertoire of music matching to images,
 Event department, dedicated to live performances , and worldwide tours (especially in Eastern Europe and Russia), as well as corporate events.

FGL Productions’ 30 Labels 
FGL Productions also manages musical rights of thirty music labels, such Revenge, Play-Time, Eva, Lolita, Editions 23, Anthology Recordings, Axe Killer, Mantra Recordings, Orphée, Edition Garzon...

References 

Record labels established in 1981
French independent record labels
Pop record labels
Classical music record labels